Frank A. Alexander (born October 18, 1937, in Glen Cove, Long Island, New York) is an American Thoroughbred horse racing trainer who race conditioned Cherokee Run to a win in the 1994 Breeders' Cup World Championships and earned American Champion Sprint Horse honors. Among his other important wins he won the 1993 Super Derby with Wallenda. 

Alexander took out his trainer's license in 1963 and in 1974 opened a public stable in Maryland. He returned to his present base in New York in 1987 and retired after a career of forty-two years having won 997 races.

References

1937 births
Living people
American horse trainers
Sportspeople from Glen Cove, New York